is a Japanese anime television miniseries that aired in the United States on Adult Swim's Toonami programming block in October 2022.

Plot
Kimi Shirokado is an eccentric little girl who lives at a low-cost housing complex called Housing Complex C in the fictional seaside town of Kurosaki. During the summer, she befriends city girl Yuri Koshide when her family moves in from Tokyo along with Middle Eastern fishing interns. A series of strange events soon occurs from dead animals appearing on the property to tenants mysteriously disappearing with moss growing inside their apartments.

Characters
 Kimi Shirokado
 
 A happy-go-lucky 9-year-old girl who resides within the complex, hinting to know more about the strange events than she lets on.

 Yuri Koshide
 
 A 10-year-old girl from Tokyo who moves into the complex with her parents and befriends Kimi, acting like a big sister figure to her. 

 Seichi Koshide
 
 Yuri's father who works as a supervisor and consultant for the foreign workers who have arrived in Kurosaki. He and his family have ulterior motives for coming to the complex.

 Keiko Koshide
 
 Yuri's mother and Seichi's wife who moves into the complex with his foreigner workers.

 Takashi Takamura
 
 An elderly man whose investigation into the strange occurrences at the complex leads to his eventual death once he pieced it all together at the cost of his sanity, leaving behind his journal with a detail of his findings, which Kimi gives to Kobayashi.

 Kisou Kobayashi
 
 An elderly inhabitant of the complex.

 Kentaro Yoshii
 
 An elderly inhabitant of the complex.

 Mitsuko Momochi
 
 An inhabitant of the complex.

 Toshi Wada
 
 An elderly woman at the complex who serves as the building manager and has prejudiced views towards the Middle Eastern interns due to them disrespecting the housing complex.

 Kanchan Mia
 
 One of the Middle Eastern interns under Mr. Koshide. He is a brutish man who seems protective of Kimi and Yuri and is the largest of the interns.

 Rubel Hossen
 
 One of the Middle Eastern interns under Mr. Koshide, representing the group. He later left the complex as tensions between his group and the residents worsen as well as discovering a link to an ancient god.

Production and release
The series was directed by Yūji Nara, with script and original concept by amphibian, and animated by Akatsuki. The series was produced by Adult Swim with Jason DeMarco serving as executive producer. The series aired on Adult Swim's Toonami programming block from October 2 to October 23, 2022. A potential televised run of the series in Japan itself currently remains in question. In June 2022, Corus Entertainment confirmed through a press release that the series would also be broadcast on Adult Swim in Canada.

The opening theme for the series is "Make Believe" by Ivan Kwong (AG), while the ending theme is "Secret of the Day" by De Tesla.

Episodes

Notes

References

External links

2022 anime television series debuts
Adult Swim original programming
Ainu in fiction
Anime with original screenplays
Cthulhu Mythos stories
Horror anime and manga
Japanese television miniseries
Television series set in 2000
Time loop anime and manga
Toonami